Serenity Media Group is a film production company founded in 2010 by Christie Hsiao.

In April 2012, Serenity Media announced the creation of a $150 million film fund in partnership with both American and Chinese investors.  As part of the deal, Serenity Media and China Lion will co-produce at least two feature-length films per year. As of 2012 the company has four independently produced untitled films in development, including "Without a Badge", in cooperation with Permut Presentations.

Before launching Serenity Media, Hsiao had previously served as executive producer on Alpine Film's "The Gold Retrievers" and Love Is the Drug.

References

External links

Mass media companies established in 2010
Film production companies of the United States